The Hanriot HD.6 was a French two-seat fighter aircraft prototype, built towards the end of World War I though not flown until after the armistice with Germany. A biplane with an unusually narrow gap between upper and lower wings, powered by a single water-cooled radial engine, it did not enter production.

Design and development
The Hanriot HD.6 was rather like a scaled-up (by nearly 30% in span), more powerful version of the  HD.5.  Both were two-seat fighters and biplanes with equal span upper and lower wings. The unstaggered wings were divided into two bays on each side by two pairs of parallel interplane struts; bracing was assisted by wires. Their  wings were almost rectangular in plan, with squared wing tips on the HD.6 though the rounded tips of its short span, horn balanced ailerons, mounted on both upper and lower planes, projected beyond. On both designs the interplane gap was unusually small, with the upper wing so close to the fuselage that its leading edge required a deep, slot like cut-out for the pilot's head. Behind him the trailing edge also had a cut-out, this for the movement of the rear gunner's two dorsal Lewis guns; he also had a single, ventrally mounted Lewis gun. From gunner to tail, the fuselage of the HD.5 had rounded decking.  The fighter's braced, rectangular tailplane, mounted on top of the fuselage had projecting horn balances on its elevators like those on the ailerons.  The fin was small but the rudder was broad chord and low; it was very rounded and extended down to the keel, so there was an elevator cut-out for rudder movement.

The HD.6 was powered by a  Salmson 18Z two row, 18-cylinder radial engine, water-cooled by three circular section radiators mounted between the legs of its fixed conventional undercarriage.  This had mainwheels on a single axle attached by V-struts to the lower fuselage, assisted by a tailskid.

Built at about the same time as the HD.5, the first flight of the sole prototype was delayed by over a year owing to development difficulties with the novel engine.  Beginning in the spring of 1919, flight testing lasted into the late summer, when further development was abandoned.

Specifications

References

 

Single-engined tractor aircraft
Biplanes
1910s French fighter aircraft
Hanriot HD.6
Aircraft first flown in 1919